Ron Jefferson (February 13, 1926, in New York City – May 7, 2007, in Richmond, Virginia) was a jazz drummer.

Considered a disciple of Max Roach, in the 1950s, he worked with Coleman Hawkins, Roy Eldridge, Oscar Pettiford, and Lester Young, among others.

A founding member of Les McCann's trio, with whom he played from 1960 to 1964, he also recorded with "Groove" Holmes, as well as with Joe Pass for Pacific Jazz Records in 1963/1964.

After leaving the West Coast, he went to live in Paris, and from there to Barcelona, backing Ruth Brown as part of a trio with pianist Stuart de Silva.

He led his own line-ups comprising Bobby Hutcherson, among others.

He was an uncle of drummer Al Foster.

Discography
As leader/co-leader
 1962: Love Lifted Me (Pacific Jazz, 1962)
 1976: Vous Ete's Swing (Catalyst)

As sideman
With Teddy Edwards
 It's About Time (Pacific Jazz, 1959) with Les McCann

With Richard "Groove" Holmes
 "Groove" (Pacific Jazz, 1961) with Les McCann and Ben Webster
 Tell It Like It Tis (Pacific Jazz, 1961–62 [1966])
 Somethin' Special (Pacific Jazz, 1962) with Les McCann

With Les McCann
 Les McCann Ltd. Plays the Truth (Pacific Jazz, 1960)
 Les McCann Ltd. in San Francisco (Pacific Jazz, 1960 [1961])
 From the Top of the Barrel (Pacific Jazz, 1960 [1967])
 Pretty Lady (Pacific Jazz, 1961)
 Les McCann Sings (Pacific Jazz, 1961)
 Les McCann Ltd. in New York (Pacific Jazz, 1961 [1962])
 Les McCann Ltd. Plays the Shampoo (Pacific Jazz, 1961 [1963])
 New from the Big City (Pacific Jazz, 1961 [1970])
 On Time (Pacific Jazz, 1962)
 A Bag of Gold (Pacific Jazz, 1960–64 [1966])

With Oscar Pettiford
 Oscar Pettiford (Bethlehem, 1954)

With Joe Pass
 The Complete Pacific Jazz Joe Pass Quartet Sessions (Mosaic, 2001) (recorded 1963/1964)

With Lou Rawls
 Stormy Monday (Capitol, 1962)
With Joe Roland
Joltin' Joe Roland (Savoy, 1955)
With Leroy Vinnegar
 Leroy Walks Again!!! (Contemporary, 1963)

With Julius Watkins and Charlie Rouse
 Les Jazz Modes (Dawn, 1957)
 Mood in Scarlet (Dawn, 1957)
 The Most Happy Fella (Atlantic, 1958)
 The Jazz Modes (Atlantic, 1959)

References

African-American jazz musicians
American jazz drummers
2007 deaths
1926 births
Jazz musicians from New York (state)
20th-century American drummers
American male drummers
20th-century American male musicians
American male jazz musicians
20th-century African-American musicians
21st-century African-American people